AO-35 may refer to:

 AO-35 assault rifle
 USS Housatonic (AO-35)